Juggy D is the debut studio album by British Indian singer Juggy D. It was released on 12 October 2004 on 2Point9 Records. Produced by Mentor and  Rishi Rich. The album is the first Punjabi language album ever to enter the UK official charts, peaking at number 70. The first single, Sohniye was released before, it received positive reviews from critics and was featured in the 2004 Bollywood film Shukriya: Till Death Do Us Apart.

Collaborators in the album are Rishi Rich, Jay Sean and Don Dee.

Track listing

Charts

References

2004 debut albums
Albums produced by Rishi Rich